Lee Penny is a former Scotland international rugby league footballer.

Penny was born in Wigan in 1974, he attended St Cuthberts Infant and Junior School and St Thomas More High School.

Penny played in the  position and was a Scotland international and played at the 2000 Rugby League World Cup.

Penny played at Warrington Wolves before moving to Salford City Reds.

He then moved on to play Rugby Union for Vale of Lune RUFC in North 1 where he spent 2 seasons.

References

External links
(archived by web.archive.org) The Teams: Scotland
(archived by web.archive.org) Penny makes début for Warrington
Warrington’s World Cup heroes – Lee Penny

1974 births
Living people
English people of Scottish descent
English rugby league players
Rugby league fullbacks
Rugby league players from Wigan
Salford Red Devils players
Scotland national rugby league team players
Warrington Wolves players